Veron Edwards (born 7 July 1950) is an Antiguan cricketer. He played in seven first-class matches for the Leeward Islands from 1964 to 1973.

See also
 List of Leeward Islands first-class cricketers

References

External links
 

1950 births
Living people
Antigua and Barbuda cricketers
Leeward Islands cricketers